Viki may refer to:

People
 Viki Gabor (born 2007), Polish singer
 Viki Kahlon (born 1993), Israeli footballer
 Viki Miljković (born 1974), Serbian singer
 Viki Saha (born 1997), Indian cricketer
 Victor Weisskopf (1908–2002), Austrian-born American physicist known as Viki to colleagues
 Viki (singer), South Korean singer and actress Kang Eun-hye (born 1988)

Other uses
 Viki (chimpanzee), the subject of one of the first experiments in ape language
 Viki (operetta), a Hungarian operetta composed by Pál Ábrahám
 Viki (streaming service), a Singaporean video streaming company
 Viki, Estonia, a village
 V.I.K.I. (Virtual Interactive Kinetic Intelligence), a character from the film I, Robot

See also
 Vici (disambiguation)
 Vicki (disambiguation)
 Vicky (disambiguation)
 Vikki (disambiguation)

Lists of people by nickname